McMahon Services is an Australian civil engineering and construction company. It was established at Dry Creek in Adelaide in 1990. McMahon Services is contracted by governments and private industry for construction and demolition projects in most states of Australia. These include construction of part of the Northern Connector freeway, and demolition of the Northern Power Station.

McMahon Services is one of 12 Class A asbestos removal licence holders (licensed to remove friable asbestos or asbestos-contaminated dust) in South Australia and claims to be Australia's largest asbestos services provider.

References

Construction and civil engineering companies of Australia
Companies based in South Australia
Construction and civil engineering companies established in 1990
Australian companies established in 1990